The name Orla has been used for two tropical cyclones in the Eastern Pacific Ocean:

 Tropical Storm Orla (1961)
 Tropical Storm Orla (1968)

Pacific hurricane set index articles